The Civil and Public Services Union (CPSU) was an Irish trade union for clerical and administrative grades in the civil service, the wider public sector and the private sector. It was a member of the Irish Congress of Trade Unions.

The union was founded in 1922 by the Dublin branch of the Civil Service Clerical Association.

At the start of 2018, the CPSU merged with the Irish Municipal, Public and Civil Trade Union and the Public Service Executive Union to form Fórsa.

References

Civil service trade unions
Trade unions established in 1922
Trade unions disestablished in 2018
Defunct trade unions of Ireland
2018 disestablishments in Ireland
1922 establishments in Ireland